Cry for the Desert is the eighth studio album by Christian singer-songwriter Twila Paris, released in 1990 by Star Song Records. The album is Paris' first time working with producer Brown Bannister, who is best known for producing Christian pop superstar Amy Grant's albums and recently produced the Christian rock group White Heart's 1989 album Freedom and features the band's rhythm section of guitarist Gordon Kennedy, bassist Tommy Sims and drummer Chris McHugh. Producer Bannister updated Paris' sound on Cry for the Desert to sound more contemporary pop while still incorporating her praise and worship music. Paris' song "How Beautiful" is now considered a modern day hymn and is used during Easter services during communion. The song is ranked in the Top 20 from CCM Magazines 2006 book The 100 Greatest Songs in Christian Music. Paris was nominated in two categories at the 22nd GMA Dove Awards for Female Vocalist of the Year and Pop/Contemporary Album of the Year. Cry for the Desert climbed up to number two on the Billboard Top Christian Albums chart.

 Track listing 
All songs written by Twila Paris.
"Tributary" (instrumental) - 2:48
"Nothing But Love" - 5:36
"Cry for the Desert" - 5:09
"He Is a Song" - 4:07
"Undivided Heart" - 5:03
"How Beautiful" - 4:29
"I Will Wait" - 4:14
"I See You Standing" - 3:57
"This Thorn" - 4:47
"Celebration/Kingdom of God" - 5:19
"Fix Your Eyes" - 5:02

 Personnel 

 Twila Paris - lead vocals (2-11), backing vocals (2,8), piano (11)
 Byron House - Fairlight (1, 7), celesta (6)
 Carl Marsh - Fairlight (tracks 1, 4), synthesizers (track 8)
 Robbie Buchanan - keyboards (2, 3, 5, 8)
 Shane Keister - keyboards (1, 2, 5, 6, 8), piano (4, 9)
 Blair Masters - Emulator III (2, 5)
 Gordon Kennedy - guitars (1-3, 5, 8)
 Jerry McPherson - guitars (2, 4, 5, 8, 11), guitar effect (1)
 Tom Hemby - guitar (9)
 Tommy Sims - bass guitar (1-5, 8)
 Chris McHugh - drums (1-5, 8, 10, 11), percussion (11)
 Charlie Peacock - guest vocals (11), keyboards (3, 10, 11)
 Brown Bannister - guest vocals (11)
 Chris Eaton - backing vocals (2, 3, 5, 8, 10)
 Chris Rodriguez - backing vocals (5, 8)Children's choir on "Cry for the Desert" Abigail Watkins
 Alicia Keaggy
 Aubree Harris
 Benjamin Bannister
 Chelsea Harris
 Ellie Bannister
 Eric Volz
 Michelle McDowell
 Sam AshworthNashville String Machine'

 Carl Gorodetzky - contractor
 Ronn Huff - woodwind and string arrangements
 Jim Laseen - bassoon
 Lee Levine - clarinet
 Ann Richards - flute
 Bobby Taylor - oboe
 Tom McAninch - horn

Production 

 Brown Bannister - producer, overdubs
 Darrell A. Harris - executive producer
 Richard Headen - production coordinator
 Bill Deaton - additional overdubs
 Brent King - orchestra recording
 Steve Bishir - assistant engineer
 Byron House - assistant engineer
 Carry Summer - assistant engineer
 Jeff Balding - mixing at Image Recording, Hollywood, California
 Doug Sax - mastering at The Mastering Lab, Hollywood, California
 The Bennett House, Franklin, Tennessee - recording location
 The Castle, Franklin, Tennessee - recording location 
 Omni Sound Recording Studios, Nashville, Tennessee - recording location
 Digital Recorders, Nashville, Tennessee - recording location
 Groudstar Laboratories, Nashville, Tennessee - recording location
 Sixteen Avenue Sound, Nashville, Tennessee - recording location
 Toni Thigpen - art direction
 Marlene Cohen - design
 Peter Darley Miller - photography

Charts

Radio singles

References 

1990 albums
Albums produced by Brown Bannister
Twila Paris albums